The Qingdao-Jinan Through Train (Chinese:青岛到济南动车组列车) is Chinese railway running between the capital Qingdao to Jinan express passenger trains by the Jinan Railway Bureau, Jinan passenger segment responsible for passenger transport task, Jinan originating on the Qingdao train. CRH5 Type Passenger trains running along the Qingdao–Jinan High-Speed Railway across Shandong provinces, the entire 363 km.

Train trips 
D6001: Jinan - Qingdao
D6002: Qingdao - Jinan
D6003: Jinan West - Qingdao
D6004: Qingdao - Jinan
D6005: Jinan - Qingdao
D6006: Qingdao - Jinan
D6007: Jinan - Qingdao North
D6008: Qingdao - Jinan
D6009: Jinan - Qingdao
D6010: Qingdao - Jinan
D6011: Jinan - Qingdao
D6012: Qingdao - Jinan
D6013: Jinan - Qingdao
D6014: Qingdao North - Jinan
D6015: Jinan - Qingdao
D6016: Qingdao - Jinan West
D6017: Jinan - Qingdao
D6018: Qingdao - Jinan West
D6019: Jinan - Qingdao North

References 

D
Rail transport in Shandong